Mark Kenneally (born 18 April 1981) in Celbridge is an Irish Marathon runner. He competed at the 2012 Olympic Games in the Men's marathon where he finished in 57th position.

In 2015 he and Ger O'Brien started a football coaching consultancy, Elite Performance Consultancy. In January 2017, both Kenneally and O'Brien started working directly for professional football club St Patrick's Athletic of the League of Ireland Premier Division, where Kenneally was made Strength and Conditioning Coach.

References

External links
IAAF Profile
RTE Profile

1981 births
Living people
Athletes (track and field) at the 2012 Summer Olympics
Olympic athletes of Ireland
Irish male marathon runners
Irish male long-distance runners
Olympic male marathon runners